Sigrid Birgitta Hambraeus (born 11 April 1930, in Västerås, Sweden) is a former Swedish politician for the Centre Party who was a MEP for the party between 1971 and 1998. As a politician she was active against nuclear power and Sweden´s membership in the European Union. In spite of the many years working for the Centre Party, including around 28 years in Riksdagen, the Swedish parliament, she changed party to the Social Democrats in her older years, something she explained in the socialist/leftist Swedish magazine Dagens ETC 2020.

Bibliography
 1976 - Vad kan du och jag göra åt framtiden?: utgångspunkter för en konstruktiv debatt
 1992 - Ett fritt, öppet Sverige: vårt samarbete med EG
 1996 - Kamp mot kärnkraften
 2009 - Att göra uppror i riksdagen (autobiography)
 2017 - Att göra bokslut

References 

1930 births
Living people
Centre Party (Sweden) politicians